Pablo Redondo Martínez (born 17 April 1982) is a Spanish professional footballer who plays as an attacking midfielder.

Club career
Born in Valencia, Redondo was a product of Valencia CF's youth system, and appeared once for the first team, playing 20 minutes in a 3–0 away win against Sevilla FC on 21 June 2003. At the season's end, he moved to Albacete Balompié also in La Liga.

For the 2005–06 campaign, Redondo signed with Madrid's Getafe CF. On 1 October 2005, he scored in a 2–1 home victory over his previous employer but, after two seasons as an important squad member, he was dropped for 2007–08 due to injury.

In 2008–09, Redondo moved to Gimnàstic de Tarragona of the second division, on a two-year contract. After playing only 11 matches in his second year he was released by Nàstic, immediately signing with another side in the second tier, Xerez CD.

On 5 December 2012, Hércules CF acquired both Redondo and Mario Rosas, who were free agents. In August of the following year, the former joined newly formed Salamanca AC.

References

External links
 
 
 
 
 
 

1982 births
Living people
Spanish footballers
Footballers from Valencia (city)
Association football midfielders
La Liga players
Segunda División players
Segunda División B players
Tercera División players
Divisiones Regionales de Fútbol players
Valencia CF Mestalla footballers
Valencia CF players
Albacete Balompié players
Getafe CF footballers
Gimnàstic de Tarragona footballers
Xerez CD footballers
Hércules CF players
CD Eldense footballers
CD Torrevieja players
CD Olímpic de Xàtiva footballers